The soucouyant or soucriant in Dominica, St. Lucian, Trinidadian, Guadeloupean folklore (also known as Loogaroo or Lougarou) in Haiti, Louisiana, Grenada and elsewhere in the Caribbean or Ole-Higue (also Ole Haig) in Guyana, Belize and Jamaica or Asema in Suriname), in The Bahamas and Barbados it is known as Hag. It is a kind of blood-sucking hag.

Legend
The soucouyant is a shapeshifting Caribbean folklore character who appears as a reclusive old woman by day. By night, she strips off her wrinkled skin and puts it in a mortar. In her  true form, as a fireball she flies across the dark sky in search of a victim. The soucouyant can enter the home of her victim through any sized hole like cracks, crevices and keyholes.

Soucouyants suck people's blood from their arms, necks, legs and soft parts while they sleep leaving blue-black marks on the body in the morning. If the soucouyant draws too much blood, it is believed that the victim will either die and become a soucouyant or perish entirely, leaving her killer to assume her skin. The soucouyant practices black magic. Soucouyants trade their victims' blood for evil powers with Bazil, the demon who resides in the silk cotton tree.

To expose a soucouyant, one should heap rice around the house or at the village cross roads as the creature will be obligated to gather every grain, grain by grain (a herculean task to do before dawn) so that she can be caught in the act. To destroy her, coarse salt must be placed in the mortar containing her skin so she perishes, unable to put the skin back on. Belief in soucouyants is still preserved to an extent in Guyana, Suriname and some Caribbean islands, including Dominica, Haiti and Trinidad.

The skin of the soucouyant is considered valuable, and is used when practicing black magic.
Many Caribbean islands have plays about the soucouyant and many other folklore characters. Some of these include Trinidad Grenada and Barbados.

Origin
Soucouyants belong to a class of spirits called jumbies. Some believe that soucouyants were brought to the Caribbean from European countries in the form of French vampire-myths. These beliefs intermingled with those of enslaved Africans.

In the French West Indies, specifically the islands of Guadeloupe and Martinique, and also in Suriname, the Soukougnan or Soukounian is a person able to shed his or her skin to turn into a vampiric fireball. In general these figures can be anyone, not only old women, although some affirm that only women could become Soukounian, because only female breasts could disguise the creature's wings.

The term "Loogaroo" also used to describe the soucouyant, possibly comes from the French word for werewolf: Loup-garou; often confused with each other since they are pronounced the same. In Haiti, what would be considered a werewolf, is called jé-rouges ("red eyes"). As in Haiti, the Loogaroo is also common in Mauritian culture. In Suriname this creature is called "Asema".

As the legend of the soucouyant has been verbally passed down over the centuries, the story has changed with the passage of time, so that the soucouyant is no longer exclusively described as an elderly woman.

Yoruba Origins

In The Bahamas there is a similar thing known as the Hag. The Hag, which is the same as the Soucouyant but with a different name, is very similar to the traditional definition of the Yoruba witch, known as Aje. Many Bahamians who descended from the Yoruba referred to old Congolese women as witches who shed their skins in the night and sucked your blood. This have many parallels to the Yoruba Aje with a few differences. Among the Yoruba, the Aje left her body and turned into an animal, but the Hag sheds her skin and turns into a ball of fire. Both the Hag and the Aje are associated with old women, leaving their bodies behind and sucking blood. It is likely the origin of the Hag and the Soucouyant have a strong connection to the Aje, or the witch of the Yoruba people.

For more about the Bahamian Hag, read "Items of Folk-lore from Bahama Negroes by Clavel published in 1904. The parallels of the Bahamian Hag and Yoruba was made during the 19th century by Alfred Burdon Ellis in his book about the Yoruba published in 1894. But he associated it with the Yoruba spirit of nightmare, known as Shigidi.

For more about the Yoruba Aje, read Divining the self by Velma E Love, who describes the Aje as: "a blood-sucking, wicked, dreadful cannibal who transforms herself into a bird at night and flies to distant places, to hold nocturnal meetings with her fellow witches."

The Bahamian Hag as described by Clavel:"when a hag enters your house, she always shed her skin. When you first see her, she appears like the flame of a candle floating about; in some way, she puts you to sleep, and resumes her body (but without the skin); she then lies on you, and sucks away every drop of blood that God has put in you." There are more references to the Bahamian Hag in Folk-tales of Andros Island, Bahamas, published in 1918 by Elsie Clews Parsons that are the same as the 1904 version of Clavel, but the Hags can also be men.

In popular culture
 In Keri Arthur's novel Demon Dance, a pair of soucouyant are the main villains.
 In Jean Rhys's Voyage in the Dark a soucouyant is one of Anna Morgan's daydreaming fears before she undergoes an abortion that leaves her bleeding to death.  It is worth noting that before the ending was edited, Anna Morgan dies of the abortion.
 Also used in Rhys's short story "The Day They Burned the Books", in a servant's description of Mrs. Sawyer, a main character in the story: "...Mildred told the other servants in the town that her eyes had gone wicked, like a soucriant's eyes, and that afterwards she had picked up some of the hair he pulled out and put it in an envelope, and that Mr. Sawyer ought to look out (hair is obeah as well as hands)".
 Also used in a third Jean Rhys book, Wide Sargasso Sea, when the former slave, Christophine, describes Antoinette's eyes as "red like soucriant".
 In "Greedy Choke Puppy", a short story by Nalo Hopkinson, a soucouyant narrates part of the story. Hopkinson's book Brown Girl in the Ring also features a soucouyant, who is delayed from her purpose of consuming blood by another character who drops rice grains on the floor, forcing the soucouyant to pick them up before proceeding.
 Appears in the novel White is for Witching: A Novel by Helen Oyeyemi.
 Soucouyant is the title and one of the primary plot devices of a novel by David Chariandy.
 A soucouyant is the title creature in the book "Nightwitch" by author Ken Douglas, which was also published under a previous pseudonym, Jack Priest.
 In Timothy Williams's  Guadeloupe novel, Un autre soleil (Another Sun), the spelling soucougnan is adopted in both French and English. 
 A soucouyant appears in The Night Piece, a collection of short-stories written by André Alexis.
 In Byzantium, a Neil Jordan film, one of the protagonists, Eleanor Webb, refers to vampires in her story as "soucriants". On the other hand, there are no references to Caribbean mythology in the movie itself and the vampires' origin is hinted as pre-Christian European.
 In Season 3 episode 6 of Sleepy Hollow, a soucouyant appears. This creature is a swarm of red insects that can gather itself into a female humanoid shape, and whose sting causes paranoid insanity. As the soucouyant is the queen of her swarm, she targets authority figures.
 In the video game Cultist Simulator, soucouyants appear as an obstacle during expeditions. They are described as being like winged old women (or occasionally men), who appear human until they discard their skins. It is implied that when an immortal being consumes their own child, they become a soucouyant, but only if the other parent was also an immortal being. They are also known as Alukites (likely a reference to Alukah) or Empousai.

See also
 Adze
 Chonchon
 Manananggal
 Rougarou
 Shtriga
 Silk cotton tree

References

Further reading
Myths and Maxims: A Catalog of Superstitions, Spirits and Sayings of Trinidad and Tobago, and the Caribbean by Josanne Leid and Shaun Riaz
The Things That Fly in the Night: Female Vampires in Literature of the Circum-Caribbean and African Diaspora by Giselle Liza Anatol

External links
triniview.com
montraykreyol.org
Trinidad and Tobago Folklore Characters
Trinidad Soucouyant

Female legendary creatures
Witchcraft in fairy tales
Witchcraft in folklore and mythology
Vampires
Caribbean legendary creatures
Grenadian culture
Guadeloupean culture
Guyanese culture
Haitian culture
Jamaican culture
Louisiana culture
Mauritian culture
Surinamese culture
Trinidad and Tobago folklore
South American ghosts
Hags